The Muslim Roma Mustafa Shibiloglu, shortened form: Shibil, (Turkish: Mustafa Şibil/Şibiloğlu) was born in Ottoman Bulgaria at the village Gradets in a Turkish Roma Drandari Musician Family.
During the Crimean War (1853-1856), with the help of the Kirdzhalis to which he belonged as a member, he opposed the Ottoman sovereignty and robbed the Bulgarian population, and he gained local power in the Balkan Mountains around Sliven. He was killed around 1870. Several Turkish Roma families in Bulgaria claim to be descendants of Mustafa Shibil, especially the musician Roma groups.

His life served as the fictional title character of the novel Shibil by Yordan Yovkov, which was filmed twice.

References

1870 deaths
Year of birth unknown
Year of death uncertain